ZyNOS is the proprietary operating system used on network devices made by Zyxel Communications. The name is a contraction of Zyxel and Network Operating System (NOS).

History 
Zyxel first introduced ZyNOS in 1998.

Versions 
Zyxel released ZyNOS version 4.0 for their GS2200 series 24 and 48 port ethernet switches in April, 2012. It appears that versions differ between Zyxel products.

Access methods 
Web and/or command-line interface (CLI) depending on the device.  Web access is accomplished by connecting an Ethernet cable between a PC and an open port on the device and entering the IP address of the device into the Web browser. An RS-232 serial console port is provided on some devices for CLI access, which is accomplished by using SSH or telnet.

CLI command types 
Listed below are the categories that the CLI commands are grouped by.

 system-related commands
 exit command
 Ethernet-related commands
 WAN-related commands
 WLAN-related commands
 IP-related commands
 PPP-related commands
 bridge-related commands
 RADIUS-related commands
 802.1x-related commands
 firewall-related commands
 configuration-related commands
 SMT-related commands.

Web Configurator 

The Web Configurator is divided into the following categories:

 basic settings
 advanced application
 IP application
 management

Security advisories 
As of January 2014 a ZyNOS ROM-0 vulnerability has been identified. This vulnerability allowed attacker to download router's configuration (ROM-0 file) without any type of authentication required. Such configuration file can be later decompressed to expose router's administrator password,  ISP password, wireless password etc.

, Danish computer security company Secunia reports no unpatched advisories or vulnerabilities on ZyNOS version 4.x.

, Secunia reports seven advisories and six vulnerabilities on ZyNOS version 3.x. Five advisories are unpatched; Secunia rates the most severe unpatched advisory as less critical.

, a DNS vulnerability has been found in certain ZyNOS firmware versions. The versions that are affected have not been narrowed down. The attack can be done from a remote location regardless if the user interface is accessible from the outside of a LAN.

References 

Network operating systems
Proprietary operating systems